Superstition Meadery is a meadery, winery and cider house founded in 2012 and based in Prescott, Arizona. As of 2016 they produce 6,000 gallons a year. They won four gold medals and one silver at the 2016 Mazer Cup International mead competition. Availability is localized to Arizona through their distribution partnership with Hensley Beverage Company, with additional direct-to-consumer shipping in 40 U.S. states, and account distribution to 25 U.S. states. They also distribute worldwide in Denmark, Thailand, Japan, and Singapore.

History 
Owners Jeff and Jen Herbert began making mead as home-brewers around 2007, and began professional production in 2012 when they entered into an alternating proprietorship with Juniper Well Ranch in Skull Valley, Az. The company opened a production facility and tasting room in the cellar of the Burmister Building in Prescott, Az in 2014.

Business awards
In 2019, Superstition was the Arizona Master Award Winner of the Success Awards by The Arizona Small Business Development Center Network (SBDC). Superstition was also recognized as the 2019 Arizona Small Business Persons of the year, where they were invited to Washington D.C. to compete for the award of best small business in the United States. They then went on to be awarded the 2019 SBA Small Business Persons of the Year award in the nation's capitol.  Other awards include being the recipients of the ASHy award from the Arizona Society of Homebrewers.

Mead and cider awards 

Awards from the international Mead Free or Die competition.

Awards from the annual Mazer Cup International.

Product line 
Superstition's product line features over 85 different meads, "including brews created with blackberries, Belgian dark candi sugar and vanilla beans, all predominantly aged in American oak, as well as bourbon, wine, craft beer and port barrels." Staples include traditional meads like Lagrimas de Oro (a semi-sweet traditional mead), melomels like the berry-based Marion and mango-based Ragnarok, a vanilla metheglin called Tahitian Honeymoon, and grape-based pyments like Aphrodisia. Superstition also produces heavier dessert meads, like the White Series: barrel aged meads with one of four berry juices and white chocolate.

See also
 Arizona wine
 List of cider brands
 Mead in the United States

References

External links 
 Superstition Meadery Official Site

Wineries in Arizona
Mead
Prescott, Arizona
Cider houses